Mound City is an unincorporated community in Crittenden County, Arkansas. Mound City township covers an area of 25.4 square miles. In 2009 it had a population of 318; 162 males and 156 females.

History
Indian mounds.The community was named to honor the numerous prehistoric Native American earthen mounds which are found in the surrounding area. The mounds have not been thoroughly investigated and are threatened by the expansion of the city of West Memphis, Arkansas. The mounds may be a manifestation of the Marksville culture dating between 500 BCE and 500 CE.

Civil War. On June 5, 1862, Federal troops disembarked on the Mississippi River at Mound City and captured the area. The Battle of Memphis was fought on June 6. On February 13, 1863, Federal troops burned communities in the area in retaliation for a Confederate raid on a steamboat and barges plying the Mississippi River. Racial tensions in Mound City were high between former African-American slaves and whites after the war.

21st century. A former plantation known as Mound City and dating from about 1900 has been renovated and the existing sharecropper houses and commissary are vacation rentals and an events facility.

References

External links
Mound City web site

Unincorporated communities in Crittenden County, Arkansas
Unincorporated communities in Arkansas